A general election was held in the U.S. state of Maine on November 3, 2020. The office of the Maine Secretary of State oversaw the election process, including voting and vote counting.

To vote by mail, registered Maine voters must have requested a ballot by October 29, 2020. As of early October some 339,930 voters had requested mail ballots. Each mailed ballot was counted if it had arrived at the relevant clerk's office by 8pm on November 3rd.

State offices

Maine Senate

All 35 seats of the Maine Senate were up for election. The Democratic Party won 22 seats and the Republican Party won 13 seats. Democrats gained Districts 13 and 34 while Republicans gained District 2.

Maine House of Representatives

All 151 seats in the Maine House of Representatives were up for election. The Democrats won 79 seats, Republicans won 66 seats, and independents won 5 seats.

Federal offices

President and vice president of the United States

Maine had 4 electoral votes in the Electoral College. Democrat Joe Biden won 3 electoral votes, the 2 statewide and the 1st congressional district, while Republican Donald Trump won 1 electoral vote from the 2nd congressional district

United States Senate

One of Maine's two United States Senators was up for election. Incumbent Republican Susan Collins won with 51% of the votes.

United States House of Representatives

Both of Maine's seats in the United States House of Representatives were up for election. 2 Democrats were elected. No seats changed hands.

See also
 Electoral reform in Maine
 Elections in Maine
 Political party strength in Maine
 Politics of Maine

References

External links
 Elections & Voting division of the Maine Secretary of State
 
 
  (State affiliate of the U.S. League of Women Voters)
 

 
Maine